Perturbation or perturb may refer to:
 Perturbation theory, mathematical methods that give approximate solutions to problems that cannot be solved exactly
 Perturbation (geology), changes in the nature of alluvial deposits over time
 Perturbation (astronomy), alterations to an object's orbit (e.g., caused by gravitational interactions with other bodies)
 Perturbation theory (quantum mechanics), a set of approximation schemes directly related to mathematical perturbation for describing a complicated quantum system in terms of a simpler one
 Perturbation (biology), an alteration of the function of a biological system, induced by external or internal mechanisms
 Perturbation function, mathematical function which relates the primal and dual problems

See also
 Annoy, annoyance
 Disturbance (disambiguation)
 Non-perturbative